Richard John Ayling (1 June 1952 – 1 November 2016) was a British rower.

Rowing career
He competed in the men's coxless four event at the 1976 Summer Olympics. He won the coxed pairs title rowing for the Kingston and Leander composite, with Mark Hayter, at the 1973 National Rowing Championships. Ayling was selected by Great Britain as part of the coxed four at the 1975 World Rowing Championships in Nottingham, the four just missed out on a medal finishing in fourth place in the A final.

In 1978, he took up coaching and was the coach of a crew that reached the final of the 1979 World Rowing Championships.

Personal life
He married German international rower Astrid Hohl in 1976. He was the editor of a magazine called 'Rowing'.

References

External links
 

1952 births
2016 deaths
British male rowers
Olympic rowers of Great Britain
Rowers at the 1976 Summer Olympics